William Park Sr. (30 June 1833 – 25 July 1903) was a Scottish professional golfer. He was a 4-time winner of the Open Championship.

Early life
Park was born in Wallyford, East Lothian, Scotland. Like some of the other early professional golfers, Park started out as a caddie. He later ran a golf equipment manufacturing business. On the course, he made his money from "challenge matches" against rivals such as Old Tom Morris, Willie Dunn and Allan Robertson, which were the most popular form of spectator golf in his era.

Playing style
Park, a tall, strong man, was a very long hitter and an excellent putter, but sometimes got into trouble through overly aggressive play. He had surpassed the older Willie Dunn by age 20, and travelled to St Andrews Links to play and learn that course. He issued a public challenge in 1853 to Robertson, generally recognised as the best player, which was, however, not taken up. Custom of the time allowed the best player to refuse a challenge of this sort without damage to his reputation. Park further fuelled controversy through his aggressive self-promotion, but this did lead to increased interest in golf rivalries, more press coverage, and more matches and tournaments being set up, developing the professional game and increasing the incomes of players such as Park, Morris, and Robertson.

Family
He married Susanna Law in Inveresk, Scotland, on 29 March 1860. The couple would have ten children.

Park's brother Mungo and his son Willie Jr. both also won the Open Championship. Mungo's victory came in 1874 and Willie Jr. had two wins, in 1887 and 1889.

Death and legacy
Park died on 25 July 1903. He is primarily best remembered as the winner of four Open Championships, including the inaugural event in 1860, when the field was just eight strong. His other victories came in 1863, 1866 and 1875. Park was the co-holder of the record for most wins in the tournament until James Braid picked up his fifth win in 1910.

Major championship

Wins (4)

Results timeline

Note: Park played only in The Open Championship.
NT = No tournament
DNP = Did not play
"T" indicates a tie for a place
Green background for wins. Yellow background for top-10

See also
 Golf in Scotland

References

Scottish male golfers
Winners of men's major golf championships
World Golf Hall of Fame inductees
Golfers from Musselburgh
1833 births
1903 deaths
People from Wallyford